In the Country of Juliets is a 1992 French drama film directed by Mehdi Charef. It was entered into the 1992 Cannes Film Festival.

Cast
 Laure Duthilleul - Therese
 Claire Nebout - Henriette
 Maria Schneider - Raissa

References

External links

1992 films
1990s French-language films
1992 drama films
Films directed by Mehdi Charef
French drama films
1990s French films